The 2022 Supertaça Cândido de Oliveira was the 44th edition of the Supertaça Cândido de Oliveira. It was played between the winners of the 2021–22 Primeira Liga and the 2021–22 Taça de Portugal, Porto, and the runners-up of the 2021–22 Taça de Portugal, Tondela, on 30 July 2022. Porto won the match 3–0 to secure their 23rd Supertaça title.

Venue

This was the twelfth time the Supertaça was played at the Estádio Municipal de Aveiro, having hosted all Supertaça matches but two since 2009, both of them played at Estádio Algarve, in 2015 and 2019.

Match

Details

Notes

References

Supertaça Cândido de Oliveira
2022–23 in Portuguese football
FC Porto matches
C.D. Tondela matches